David Barker may refer to:

 David Barker Jr. (1797–1834), U.S. Representative from New Hampshire
 David Barker (epidemiologist) (1938–2013), English physician and epidemiologist
 David Barker (equestrian) (born 1935), British Olympic equestrian
 David Barker (zoologist) (1922–2009), British zoologist and neurologist
 David Barker (cricketer) (born 1951), English cricketer
 David R. Barker (born 1961),  American author, academic and businessman
 Dave Barker (born 1948), Jamaican singer
 David Barker Stevenson (1801–1859), Canadian businessman
 David B. Barker (born 1943), British Olympic equestrian
 David G. Barker (born 1952), American herpetologist